CMPD may refer to:

 Crisis Management and Planning Directorate
 Charlotte-Mecklenburg Police Department
 Costa Mesa Police Department